,  or  are forked roof finials found in Japanese and Shinto architecture.  predate Buddhist influence and are an architectural element endemic to Japan.

Origin 
 are thought to have been employed on Japanese buildings starting from the 1st century AD. Their existence during the Kofun period (250–538 AD) is well documented by numerous artifacts.

One theory is that they were simply interlocking bargeboard planks that were left uncut. Another is that they were part of a support system anchored on the ground to stabilize the roof. Yet another theory proposes that they were used to "pinch" and hold thatch roofing together. However, the only certain fact is that  were originally a working part of the structure, but as building techniques improved, their function was lost and they were left as decorations.

 were likely only to have decorated the homes and warehouses of powerful families, and more decorations signified higher rank. This tradition continued until relatively recent times. In the 17th to 19th centuries, the legal code dictated how many  were allowed on building roofs in accordance with the owner's social rank. Today,  are found only on Shinto shrines.

Design 

 may be built directly into the roof as part of the structure, or simply attached and crossed over the gable as an ornament. While  are predominantly placed only at the ends of the roof, this method allows them to sometimes be placed in the middle as well.

More ornate , such as at Ise Shrine, are cut with one or two , or "wind-slots", and a third open cut at the tip, giving it a forked appearance. Gold metal coverings serve both protective and ornamental purposes. Usually, if the tops are cut vertically, the enshrined  is a male, otherwise a female.

The angle at which the  faces and the number of  the building contains are used to identify the gender of the  enshrined within. Upward-facing, with an even number of  indicate a female . Outward-facing , with an odd number of  indicate a male . This is not a hard and fast rule, as there are exceptions (such as the shrines in Ise Grand Shrine.)

Names 

Names for  can vary from region. In Kyoto, Nara Prefecture, and Hiroshima, they are called . In parts of Toyama, Osaka, Kōchi, Tokushima and Miyazaki prefectures, they are called ; in some areas of Yamagata, Miyagi, Yamanishi, Hiroshima and Kōchi prefectures, they are called .

Gallery

See also 
 Glossary of Shinto for terms concerning Shinto and Shinto architecture.

Notes

References 

Fletcher, Banister, Sir. (1996). A History of Architecture.  Architectural Press. .
Lucas, B. (2002, May 7). . Harvey Mudd College Web. Retrieved June 1, 2009

Japanese architectural features
Classical Japan
Roofs
Shinto architecture